"Pjesma za kraj" (English translation: Song for the end) is a pop song by the Croatian singer Franka Batelić, recorded for the Croatian selection for the Eurovision Song Contest 2009. It finished the 7th with a total of 18 points won.

HRT Dora 2009 
With "Pjesma za kraj" Franka Batelić took part in the Croatian selection for the Eurovision Song Contest 2009, and she was qualified directly into the finals. The final event of Dora 2009 was held on 29 February 2009, and sixteen contestants took part in; Batelić performed the seventh. Her songs received only four points from the jury and 14 points from the votes, and finished the 7th with a total of 18 points.

Track listing
Croatian Airplay Single
"Pjesma za kraj" – 3:15

See also 
 Croatia in the Eurovision Song Contest
 Croatia in the Eurovision Song Contest 2009
 HRT Dora

References

External links 
 Dora 2009 Performance at YouTube
 Official Studio Version at YouTube
 Lyrics

2009 singles
Franka Batelić songs
2009 songs
Songs written by Bora Đorđević